The Church of Our Lady of the Assumption (Nuestra Señora de la Asunción), commonly known as the Santa Maria Church is the parish church of Santa Maria in Ilocos Sur province, Philippines. The church was designated as a UNESCO World Heritage Site on December 11, 1993, as part of the Baroque Churches of the Philippines, a collection of four Baroque Spanish-era churches.

The Santa Maria Church is an attraction to tourists and Catholics in Ilocos Sur. It is a reminder of the four centuries of Spanish domination of that area and a unique structure with a diversified architectural design of bricks and mortar. It was built on top of a hill a lookout and a citadel as well as a religious center during the early administration of the region by friars and soldiers of Spain.

History
The parish of Santa Maria started as a chapel-of-ease (visita) of Narvacan, its neighboring town to the north, in 1567. The influx of the settlers after the full conquest of the Ilocos Region by the Spaniards greatly increased the population of Santa Maria. The chapel became an independent ministry in 1769 and was dedicated to the Virgin Mary under the title of Our Lady of the Assumption. Besides economic progress, evangelical missions were expanded. The mission at Santa Maria, located on a narrow flat plain between the sea and the central mountain range of Luzon, close to the interior settlements, made Santa Maria as the center of both the religious and commercial activities.

According to the legend, before the Santa Maria Church was built on its present site, the Virgin Mary was enshrined at a different place called Bulala. The frequent disappearance of the Virgin Mary from her previous place of enthronement only to be found perched on a guava tree that grew where the present church is located, had led the townspeople to move the church to its present location.

Father Mariano Dacanay, the Ilocano parish priest from September 1, 1902, to May 27, 1922, has another variation of this legend which he assures, was gathered from reliable sources. He relates that the Blessed Virgin was enthroned in another chapel that was formerly erected below the present church and what is now the East Central Elementary School compound. Father Dacanay adds, that from this chapel, the Virgin Mary made her peregrinations to that guava tree on the knoll.

This version of Father Dacanay of the legend gains greater probability if not credence for today, one of the twin structures bearing the features and architectural designs of what could have been a chapel or a church by then obtaining standards remains intact in said school compound and presently used as a classroom for grade school pupils.

Numerous and varying legends or stories about the Virgin Mother have long become part of Philippine religious lore. And if any one of them could be accepted as truth, then it is the blessed Virgin herself who manifested in a miraculous way her preference of a site for her permanent home.

Construction of the present church was started in 1765. In 1810, the bell tower was built during the renovation of the church and furnished with a bell the following year. During the renovation of church complex in 1863, the protective wall around the sides of the hill was constructed. After the bell tower was remodeled the same year, its foundation must have gradually settled down making the imposing structure slightly leaning or tilting as it appears today. The convent was greatly renovated in 1895.

Many foreigners who traveled to the north and saw the church were much impressed by its size and setting calling the church as a cathedral. Henry Savage Landor, an English painter, writer and explorer who visited the Philippines in 1900, says:

At Santa Maria a most picturesque church is to be found, reached on an imposing flight of steps. An enormous convent stands beside the church, upon a terrace some 80 feet above the plaza. There are a number of brick buildings, schoolhouses and office, which must have been very handsome but are tumbling down, the streets being in the absolute possession of sheeps, goats and hogs. A great expanse of level land was now well-cultivated into paddy fields and across it is a road fifteen feet wide, well-metalled and with a sandy surface. Barrios and homes were scattered all around the plain.

The massive and imposing structure of the Santa Maria Church is not only an interesting landmark, but it is also a memorial to the intrepid Christian missionaries who sacrificed and devoted their lives to spread the Christian faith in this region; the natives and the men of technical knowledge who erected the great structure and others who may in one way or another are credited to the building of the Santa Maria Church.

The church was listed as one of the most endangered monuments in the world by World Monuments Fund in the 2010 World Monuments Watch, along with the Rice Terraces of the Philippine Cordilleras and San Sebastian Church (Manila). All of the sites were taken off the list in 2011 after the passage of the National Cultural Heritage Act.

Design
Unlike other town churches in the Philippines, which conform to the Spanish tradition of sitting them on the central plaza, the Church and Convent of Our Lady of the Assumption in Santa Maria are situated on a hill surrounded by a defensive wall on all sides like a fortress. The church is reached by climbing an 85-step stairway of granite rock. The grand three-flight stairway leads to a courtyard in front of the church doorway where a sweeping view of the lower plains and the town of Santa Maria is beheld. A narrow roadway coming from the back of the church also leads up to the courtyard but only used on special occasions.

Façade 

The church brick façade has one large portal with three windows. The recessed arched entrance is flanked by a pair of rectangular pilaster dividing the façade into three well-defined planes. The whole facade is then framed on the sides by heavy circular buttresses topped by urn-like finials.

An open pediment in the upper façade is topped by a small cupola. The curvilinear shape of the pediment serves as a graceful finish to the upward movement of the pilasters and the arch entrance. The blind niche, urn-shaped pinnacles and even proportions-overlooking at the top are decorative devices of the upward movement.

Nave

The church follows the standard Philippine layout with the facade fronting a long single nave rectangular building. The thick outer walls have delicately carved side entrances with few openings. The eastern and western side of the outer walls are reinforced by thirteen huge rectangular buttresses each typical of Earthquake Baroque architecture. The first buttress from the front is adorned by a huge relief retelling how the statue of Our Lady of Assumption was found on top of a tree. The relief is visible as one ascends the front stairway. The middle buttress on the eastern wall (back) is built like a staircase for easy maintenance of the roof back when thatched roof was the norm in Philippine churches, before the advent of corrugated galvanised iron (CGI). The lighter CGI roof is also preferred in earthquake-prone areas than tile roof.

Bell tower
The bell tower is freestanding, constructed separate from the church and not parallel to the facade but situated about a third of the wall from the front. The octagonal four-story tower was built wide, with each level narrowing till it reaches the top, typical of earthquake baroque church towers. The top floor is covered by a dome that is capped by cupola. A cross above the cupola tops the structure. Blank walls are arranged alternately with open windows. Other decorative devices, like single pilasters, finials and balustrades indicate that this form is of later vintage. A clock on the third level faces the stairway for the churchgoers to see.

Convent
In front of the church is the convent, partly blocking the frontal view of the façade of Santa Maria Church. The placement of the convent in front of the church and not adjacent is another unusual characteristic of the building, probably dictated by the long narrow hill on which the church is located. It is accessible from the church by an elevated stone walkway. In the early days of the colonization, the convent was the seat of the ecclesiastical administration as well as home of the church clergies. Under the elevated walkway is a gate that leads to the back courtyard with a commanding view of the back countryside.

Cemetery
Another wide stairway, similar to the front, leads down from the courtyard to a brick walkway that leads to an old abandoned cemetery evergreen with brush and weeds. Within the brick fence of the square-shaped cemetery are the ruins of an old brick chapel and old graveyards.

Historical designations

National Historical Landmark
The National Historical Institute (now the National Historical Commission of the Philippines) installed a marker next to the door of Santa Maria Church following Executive Order nos. 260 on August 1, 1973; 375 on January 14, 1974; and 1515 on June 11, 1978, declaring the Santa Maria Church as a National Historical Landmark.

National Cultural Treasure
With Republic Act No. 10066 - National Cultural Heritage Act of 2009 in place, all structures 50 years or older, structures with historical markers, and all structures designed by National Artists (regardless of age) are now presumed to be declared and cannot be demolished or altered without the permission of the National Commission for Culture and the Arts (NCCA). This is an attempt to compile all lists of formally declared cultural and historical structures and sites in the Philippines and make it available to the public via the Internet since the National Museum (NM) and National Historical Commission of the Philippines (NHCP), both under the NCCA, maintain their own lists. Santa Maria Church Complex and Cemetery was declared one of the National Cultural Treasure of the Philippines in 2015 by the National Museum.

Miraculous image of Our Lady of the Assumption

The statue of Apo Baket is made of wood in ornate sculptural style with ivory face and hands. Her hands are extended wide, and her head is looking upward portraying her assumption into heaven. Her blue cape is decorated with silver floral designs and her white dress is embroidered with gold thread motif. She stands on a pedestal of cloud surrounded by angels’ heads. This image with her bejeweled dress was kept in an elaborate carved wooden chest believed to have used for cargo in galleon ship. Her feast day is August 15.

References

External links

Baroque Churches of the Philippines - UNESCO World Heritage Site

Roman Catholic churches in Ilocos Sur
Baroque architecture in the Philippines
National Cultural Treasures of the Philippines
Agustin in Manila, San
National Historical Landmarks of the Philippines
Brick buildings and structures
Spanish Colonial architecture in the Philippines
Churches in the Roman Catholic Archdiocese of Nueva Segovia